Corrado Veneziano (born 1958 Tursi, Italy) is an Italian painter, visual artist, author and academic.

Veneziano has exhibited artwork in exhibitions in Italy, Russian and elsewhere in Western Europe.  He has lectured on and published on the Italian language and its dialects,

Biography 
Veneziano was born in Tursi in 1958.  In 1976, he studied directing at the Piccolo Theatre School in Milan while also taking courses at the University of Milan at the Faculty of Modern Literature.

Veneziano graduated from the University of Bari (Faculty of Literature) with qualification to teach Latin and Italian languages, history and philosophy. Nowadays, Corrado Veneziano works as a theater director. He also teaches pronunciation and phonetics.

In 1999, Veneziano moved to Rome to take a job with the Department of Linguistics at the Silvio D'Amico Academy of Dramatic Art.  In  2002, he began teaching a course on the Italian language and its dialects. During these years, Veneziano  also served as a lecturer of rhetoric and communication.  He also taught a course in Italian Studies at Harvard College.

Veneziano has published several works on Italian pronunciation.

In 2013, Veneziano opened his personal exhibition "Le forme dei non-luoghi" ("Forms of no spaces) in the ECOS gallery in Rome. That same year, Veneziano published the catalog Ponte Sisto The book contains his works created between 2000 and 2012.  It received a  positive review from Achille Bonito Oliva. In November, 2013 Veneziano exhibited his works at the Institute of Italian Culture in Brussels during the during "Non-places" event.

In 2015. Veneziano exhibited his work at the exhibition Isbn Dante e altre visioni in Paris at the Espace en Cours. Also in 2015, RAI commissioned a painting from Veneziano for the Prix Italy exhibition in Turin.  Titled  "The Power of History. Laboratory of creativity." Veneziano's work was dedicated to Herodotus.

In 2016, Veneziano staged the exhibition "L'Anima dei non-luoghi" ("Soul Code") in St. Petersburg, Russia at the Nevsky 8 Gallery. The exhibition included the works inspired by ISBN codes.

Personal exhibitions 
 Venice International University, Theater workshop "Ciao: East of East, Exhibition: VIU Students’ works of art" 2008
 Rome - Ecos Gallery - 2012: L'anima dei non luoghi. With an introduction by Achille Bonito Oliva e critic note by Marc Augé, curated by Flavio Alivernini;
 Bruxelles - Institute of Italian Culture - 2014: Non Luoghi, No Loghi. With an introduction by Derrick de Kerckhove;
 Paris - Espace en Cours - 2015: Isbn Dante e altre visioni, curated by Julie Heintz;
 Saint Petersburg - Gallery "Nevskij 8" - 2016: Isbn I codici dell'anima, curated by Francesco Attolini.
 Puglia/Basilicata (Maratea, Policoro, Polignano a Mare, Alberobello) - Summer 2016: Nati sotto il segno..., curated by Raffaella Salato.
 Saint Petersburg - Gallery "Nevskij 8" - 2017, February : Segni, loghi e corruzioni, curated by Raffaella Salato.
 Rome, Roman Houses of the Celio, in agreement with the Ministry of Cultural Heritage and the Ministry of the Interior, 2017, April/May: Pietas, curated by Raffaella Salato.
 Lanzhou - China, National Gallery of contemporary Art, 2017, Segni, curated by Wu Weidong.

References

External links 
 Ciao: East of East, Exhibition: VIU Students’ works of art" 
 L'anima dei non luoghi.
 Isbn Dante e altre visioni

1958 births
Living people
Italian male painters
People from the Province of Matera
Academic staff of Conservatorio Santa Cecilia
20th-century Italian painters
20th-century Italian male artists
21st-century Italian painters
21st-century Italian male artists